Bankipore or Bankipur Assembly constituency is one of 243 constituencies of legislative assembly of Bihar. It is a segment of Patna Sahib Lok Sabha constituency. In 2015 Bihar Legislative Assembly election, Bankipur will be one of the 36 seats to have VVPAT enabled electronic voting machines.

Overview
Bankipore comprises Ward Nos. 4, 5, 7 to 13 & 15 in Patna Municipal Corporation of Patna Rural CD Block.

Members of Legislative Assembly

Election results

2020

2015

2010

Old Segment Election Results

2005 Vidhan Sabha

See also
 List of Assembly constituencies of Bihar
 Bankipore

References

External links
 

Assembly constituencies in Patna district
Politics of Patna district
Assembly constituencies of Bihar